Dr Challoner's High School, abbreviated to DCHS, is a grammar school for girls between the ages of 11 and 18, located in Buckinghamshire, England. In August 2011 the school became an Academy.

In September 2001, the school was awarded specialist school status as a Sports College, by the Department for Education and Skills (DfES). It was also awarded a second specialism as a Language College. It is an affiliate member of the Girls' Schools Association. In 2011, Ofsted judged the school to be Outstanding and in 2014 DCHS achieved the Exceptional Schools Award.

History

The school was established in 1962 as an all-girls' school, when the previously mixed Dr Challoner's Grammar School became an all-boys' school, due to increasing roll numbers.

Entry
To gain entry to the school, pupils from primary schools in the local area are invited to do the 11-plus exam. Entry to a grammar school usually requires a score of 121/141, though pupils who gain scores of below 121 are invited to appeal their case. Prospective pupils who did not take the 11+ (e.g. those who join in later years) also take the school's own entry test.

House system
The school operates a house system, with girls being placed in one of the six houses at the start of their time at the school along with the rest of their forms. The six houses are named after notable women in history and each have a corresponding colour: Bronte is blue, Curie is green, Nightingale is purple, Pankhurst is yellow, Teresa is red and Rosa is orange. Six girls in the upper sixth are appointed the head of houses each year. The houses play a part in music and sports in the school, with girls earning points for winning competitions and events, in particular interhouse, a sports half-day competition occurring once a term for years 7–11. At the end of each academic year one house will win the house cup for having the most points.

Facilities and classes

Initial subjects
Pupils are introduced to a wide range of subjects from Year 7, including Computer Science, Art, Music and Drama. Pupils study French, German and Spanish for the first year. In years 8 and 9 the students study Latin, in turn dropping one of their other two languages, before continuing on with at least one language at GCSE level.

All pupils take at least eight subjects for GCSE, although most take 9 or 10 subjects. Three A levels are taken by most students but in the case of certain subjects (further maths, music etc.), or outstanding achievement at GCSE, students may take four. The vast majority of pupils go on to university or some form of higher education.

School buildings
The Tower Block: Humanity subjects, Religious Studies, History and Geography are taught here, as well as Classics and Latin. This building was part of the school when it first opened in 1962.
The Science Block: Also part of the school when it first opened, the three sciences are taught here. The art rooms were previously situated upstairs but have been renovated to become new science rooms.
The Curved Building: Added in the early 1980s, extended in 1992 and again in 1998, English, Maths and Art are taught here. The library is also situated in this building, as is the Sixth Form Common Room and the Careers Room. The curved space between the Curved Building and the Tower Block creates a naturally sloped outdoor theatre area.
The Modern Foreign Languages Building: Known as the MFL Block, French, Spanish and German are taught here, although the Music teaching and practice rooms are also attached to it. 
The Sports Hall: Completed in 2002, most indoor sports lessons are held here. There are changing rooms with showers available. The school fields and Tennis, Netball and astro-turf courts are situated by this building.

The school's original gym and a dance and drama studio, built more recently, were knocked down to make way for a new drama complex, completed around 2009 with the help of fundraising and donations from parents. There is also a canteen and Main Hall at the front of the school, attached to the Tower Block and part of the original school of 1962.

Headteachers
1962–1974: Agnes McMaster
1974–1986: Jean Williams
1986–1993: Sheila Cousens
1993–2003: Sue Lawson
2003–2006: Hilary Winter
2006 (Summer term): Andrew MacTavish, acting headmaster
2006–2011: Peg Hulse
2011–2015: Ian Cooksey
2015–present: Alan Roe

Notable former pupils

Fern Britton, television presenter
Amal Clooney, lawyer, activist and author
Anna Gilford (performs under the name Honey G), The X Factor contestant
Lucy Winkett, first female Canon of St Paul's Cathedral

Notable achievements
In 2014 the school was awarded Exceptional Schools Award by the Best Practice Network, only the ninth school in the whole country to receive the award after an extensive inspection. In 2011 DCHS was judged to be an Outstanding school by OFSTED.

In 2008, Dr Challoner's High achieved the best A Level results of any Buckinghamshire state school with an A/B pass rate of 84%. At GCSE the A*/A grade pass rate was 81% and over a third of girls achieved all A*/As. The school has appeared in the Times Parent Power school league tables; 31st best state school in 2007, 16th in 2008 and 23rd in 2009, each time being the top state school in Buckinghamshire. Ofsted rated 'Grade 1 – Outstanding' in its last inspection of the school in 2011.

In 2010 the school achieved another set of outstanding A Level results. 22.3% of entries were graded A*, a higher figure than any other Buckinghamshire school. Over 88% of entries were graded A*-B.

In recent years the school has also won Good Schools' Guide awards in History, Politics and Spanish. The Politics department won the top prize, achieving the best A Level results of any school in England for the period 2004–06. In addition to its academic success, the school has a proud reputation for sporting success, recently winning the national U16 basketball title and the tennis team were national runners-up in the year 8 and under Nestle School Teams Tennis competition. In December 2008 the school won the national junior cross-country championships held in Leicestershire.

Debating

The school has a well established debating society with arguably the best record in Buckinghamshire in recent years at the top university-run competitions. The society typically enters the Oxford and Cambridge competitions, with the UCL, Durham and Bristol university competitions also featuring in recent years. The International Competition for Young Debaters (ICYD) has been a mainstay for the school's younger debaters. In 2010 the school also entered a new competition at SOAS and in the recent past several girls have participated in trials for the England team.

In February 2008 a Challoner's team won the regional round of the Oxford Union schools' competition, overcoming 32 grammar and independent schools to make it to the national finals. The school's record in the Oxford competition in particular is excellent; with at least 1 team breaking to finals day almost every year. In the 2008–09 academic year the school also came 5th (out of 48 teams) in the UCL senior competition and in the Oxford finals in the same year reached the top 15 to make two of the school's debaters eligible for England trials in the autumn term of 2009.

In the 2009–10 season the school's top pair won the schools' debating tournament at the School of Oriental and African Studies (SOAS) coming top out of 75 pairs from some of the best debating schools in England. The pair also made it through to the semi-final of the Durham University schools' competition finishing in 7th place overall from over 100 teams. In March 2010 the same pair achieved 6th place (out of 88 teams) in the Oxford Union competition overcoming schools such as Dulwich College, University College School and Marlborough, and just behind St Paul's boys and Westminster. It was also pleasing to be the top Bucks school in the competition, finishing well ahead of local rivals Aylesbury Grammar and Dr Challoner's Grammar.

Moreover, the debating society has also established links with the debating society at the local boys' school to create the Challoners' Debating Society. Debating takes place in all year groups, with a designated Debating Prefect taking responsibility for the lower school teams.

Uniform
White and blue striped shirt with a navy v-neck jumper, a pleated navy skirt and a navy blazer.

See also
 Grammar schools in the United Kingdom

References

External links
Department for Education Performance Tables 2011

Girls' schools in Buckinghamshire
Grammar schools in Buckinghamshire
Educational institutions established in 1962
Amersham
Academies in Buckinghamshire
1962 establishments in England